Roberto Urretavizcaya (born 22 August 1948) is an Argentine boxer. He competed in the men's light flyweight event at the 1968 Summer Olympics.

References

External links
 

1948 births
Living people
Argentine male boxers
Olympic boxers of Argentina
Boxers at the 1968 Summer Olympics
Sportspeople from Buenos Aires Province
Light-flyweight boxers